Waycross is the county seat of, and only incorporated city in, Ware County in the U.S. state of Georgia. The population was 14,725 at the 2010 Census and dropped to 13,942 in the 2020 census.

Waycross includes two historic districts (Downtown Waycross Historic District and Waycross Historic District) and several other properties that are on the National Register of Historic Places, including the U.S. Post Office and Courthouse, Lott Cemetery, the First African Baptist Church and Parsonage, and the Obediah Barber Homestead (which is seven miles south of the city). The city is also referenced in the song Miller's Cave by the international Submarine Band.https://www.bluegrasslyrics.com/song/millers-cave/

History

The area now known as Waycross was first settled circa 1820, locally known as "Old Nine" or "Number Nine" and then Pendleton. It was renamed Tebeauville in 1857, incorporated under that name in 1866, and designated county seat of Ware County in 1873. It was incorporated as "Way Cross" on  March 3, 1874. Waycross gets its name from the city's location at key railroad junctions; lines from six directions meet at the city.

The city council in Waycross opened municipal primary elections to white women in 1917, the first town in Georgia to do so. This action was taken because some of the largest property owners in town were women who wanted a say in how their tax dollars were spent. It wasn't until two years later in 1919 that Atlanta became the second Georgia city to do this. Georgia women would not get the right to vote generally in all elections until 1922.

Waycross was home to Laura S. Walker (1861-1955) a noted author and conservationist. Walker promoted a comprehensive program of forestry activity, including the establishment of forest parks. She erected markers and monuments along old trails and at historic sites, in Waycross and Ware County so that local history would not be forgotten. An effort to recognize her work culminated in President Franklin D Roosevelt issuing a proclamation to establish the Laura S Walker National Park in her honor. She was the only living person for whom a state or national park was named. In 1937, the federal government purchased distressed farmland for the park. Work on the park was undertaken by the Works Progress Administration and the Civilian Conservation Corps. In 1941, the national park was deeded over to Georgia, becoming the State's 13th state park.

Waycross was the site of the 1948 Waycross B-29 crash, which led to the legal case United States v. Reynolds (1953), expanding the government's state secrets privilege.

During the 1950s the city had a tourist gimmick: local police would stop motorists with out-of-state license plates and escort them to downtown Waycross. There they would be met by the Welcome World Committee and given overnight lodging, dinner and a trip to the Okefenokee Swamp. The tradition faded away after the interstates opened through Georgia.

In the mid-1990s, the Flanders Hamburgers, a frozen hamburger that needed no defrosting, was created in Waycross. This was the creation of Eaves Foods, Inc., a company that later changed to Flanders, LLC. in 2000. Bubba Burgers are now sold nationwide as well as worldwide through the United States Military Commissary system.

Geography
Waycross is located at  (31.213860, -82.354911) and is the closest city to the Okefenokee Swamp.

The closest major city is Jacksonville, Florida, which is roughly 81 miles away.

In May 2010, the city purchased the Bandalong Litter Trap and installed it in Tebeau Creek, a tributary of the Satilla River. The trap was invented in Australia, but is manufactured in the United States. Although the city has maintained a good standing with the state's Environmental Protection Division, the city wanted to take action to reduce the amount of human generated trash entering the Satilla River and ultimately the Atlantic Ocean. Georgia Governor Sonny Perdue said, "Water is one of Georgia's most important and precious resources... the litter trap installed by Waycross is a model of stewardship for the state and the nation." The Satilla River litter trap is the first in Georgia and only the second in the nation.

Part of Waycross was situated in Pierce County, but effective July 1, 2015, Waycross was no longer located nor allowed to be located in Pierce County. State Rep. Chad Nimmer introduced HB 523 during the 2015 Legislative Session without providing the required statutory notice to the City of Waycross. HB 523 de-annexed the portion of Waycross located in Pierce County and prevents the City of Waycross from coming back into Pierce County.

Climate

Media
 Waycross Journal-Herald discontinued, restarted as weekly paper(daily newspaper)
 The Florida Times-Union (Georgia Times-Union edition)
 Waycross Area Television Service (WATS) Channel 10

AM
 WAYX AM 1230  (News Talk Radio)
 WSFN AM 1350 (Sports Radio)

FM
 W201DK 88.1 (Christian)
 WXVS 90.1 (GPB and NPR)
 WASW 91.9 (Contemporary Christian)
 WAYX 96.3  (Classic Rock) Simulcast with WSIZ
 WWUF 97.7  (Adult Contemporary)
 WYNR 102.5 (Country)
 WQGA 103.3 (Adult Contemporary)
 WKUB 105.1 (Country)
 WSGT 107.1 (Oldies)

Television
WXGA-TV, a Georgia Public Broadcasting outlet, is licensed to Waycross and also serves nearby Valdosta.

Waycross is part of the Jacksonville, Florida television market.

Health care

With over 100 employees and 10 physicians, Satilla Regional Medical Center is a leading center in health care in the area. The three-story facility has a trauma unit, cancer care unit, outpatient surgery and imaging services. In 2012, Satilla Regional Medical Center joined the Mayo Clinic Health System and became the Mayo Clinic Health System in Waycross. The Mayo Clinic ceased operations of the hospital in 2015. The hospital later joined HCA Healthcare and has since been renamed Memorial Satilla Health.

Transportation
U.S. Highway 1 runs north–south through Waycross, while concurrent with U.S. Highway 23. U.S. Highway 82 is an east–west highway in Waycross. U.S. Highway 84 runs east–west through Waycross. There are no limited-access highways anywhere near Waycross; Interstate 75 is 60 miles to the west, and Interstate 95 is 40 miles to the east. Waycross-Ware County Airport (IATA: AYS, ICAO: KAYS, FAA LID: AYS) is a public airport located three miles (5 km) northwest of the central business district of Waycross. It is owned by the City of Waycross and Ware County.

Six railroad lines meet at Waycross, making it a logical location for shunting freight to different destinations.  CSX Transportation operates Rice Yard here, a major "hump"-type classification yard.

Demographics

2020 census

As of the 2020 United States Census, there were 13,942 people, 5,748 households, and 3,197 families residing in the city.

2010 census
As of the 2010 United States Census, there were 14,649 people living in the city. The racial makeup of the city was 54.8% Black, 39.6% White, 0.3% Native American, 0.8% Asian, 0.0% Pacific Islander, 0.2% from some other race and 1.5% from two or more races. 2.8% were Hispanic or Latino of any race.

2000 census
As of the census of 2000, there were 15,333 people, 6,094 households, and 3,741 families living in the city. The racial makeup of the city was 44.31% White, 53.51% African American, 0.12% Native American, 0.62% Asian, 0.02% Pacific Islander, 0.68% from other races, and 0.74% from two or more races. Hispanic or Latino of any race were 1.37% of the population.

There were 6,094 households, out of which 27.7% had children under the age of 18 living with them, 36.3% were married couples living together, 21.0% had a female householder with no husband present, and 38.6% were non-families. Individuals made up 34.9% of all households, and 16.0% had someone living alone who was 65 years of age or older. The average household size was 2.37, and the average family size was 3.09.

In the city, the population was spread out, with 26.3% under the age of 18, 8.5% from 18 to 24, 25.2% from 25 to 44, 20.5% from 45 to 64, and 19.5% who were 65 years of age or older. The median age was 37 years. For every 100 females, there were 83.9 males. For every 100 females age 18 and over, there were 76.9 males.

The median income for a household in the city was $23,399, and the median income for a family was $28,712. Males had a median income of $24,865 versus $18,750 for females. The per capita income for the city was $13,468. About 24.8% of families and 30.4% of the population were below the poverty line, including 45.9% of those under age 18 and 17.0% of those age 65 or over.

Education

Ware County School District
The Ware County School District holds pre-school to grade twelve, and consists of a pre-school, six elementary schools, two middle schools, and one high school. The district has 431 full-time teachers and over 6,370 students.

Private education
Southside Christian School

 Discovery Montessori School

Higher education
South Georgia State College - Waycross campus
Coastal Pines Technical College - Waycross campus

Notable people

Johnny Archer — professional pool player, "The Scorpion"
 Michael P. Boggs — Chief Justice of the Supreme Court of Georgia and former judge on the Georgia Court of Appeals.
Stanley Booth — author, journalist, music critic
Billy Carter — brother of former President Jimmy Carter, promoter of Billy Beer
Sonora Webster Carver — first woman horse diver
Ossie Davis — actor, writer, director, producer, Kennedy Center Honors award recipient, was born in Clinch County
Nikki DeLoach — former member of The New Mickey Mouse Club, the girl group , and actress on the television series North Shore and Windfall
Harry D. Dixon — state representative; served in the Georgia House of Representatives for 38 years; served on the board of the Georgia Department of Transportation
Drayton Florence — professional football player, cornerback who played 11 seasons in NFL, highest draft pick ever from Tuskegee University
Ernest Jones - professional football player for the Los Angeles Rams
Tim McCray — professional football player from 1985 to 1990 in the CFL with the Saskatchewan Roughriders
Leodis McKelvin — former cornerback in the NFL (currently a free agent)
Caroline Pafford Miller — Pulitzer Prize-winning author
Gram Parsons — country singer and musician; The Byrds, The Flying Burrito Brothers, and solo artist
Pernell Roberts — actor, star of TV series Bonanza and Trapper John, M.D., was born in Waycross
Bill Shanks — Atlanta Braves sportscaster
Joshua Rouse, retired actor, known for playing Jerry Ford in movie, The Sim Racer

See also

On the National Register of Historic Places:
First African Baptist Church and Parsonage
Lott Cemetery
Phoenix Hotel
United States Post Office and Courthouse

References

External links 

 City of Waycross
 Waycross Local community website with community events calendar
 Waycross Tourism & Conference Bureau
 Historic Waycross
 South Georgia Historic Newspapers Archive, Digital Library of Georgia

Cities in Georgia (U.S. state)
Waycross, Georgia micropolitan area
Cities in Ware County, Georgia
County seats in Georgia (U.S. state)